The loggerhead musk turtle (Sternotherus minor) is a species of turtle in the family Kinosternidae. This turtle has a large head which has a light-colored background with dark spots or stripes present on the head and neck.

The species is native to the southern United States, being found in rivers, wetlands, and streams in the states of Alabama, Florida, and Georgia. The diet of an adult loggerhead musk turtles consists mostly of clams and snails.

As of 2016 the conservation status of the loggerhead musk turtle is "Least Concern", and its common threats include habitat loss and human interactions such as car or boating accidents.

Description 
The loggerhead musk turtle gets its common name from its unusually large head, compared to the common musk turtle (Sternotherus odoratus). Its head has a light-colored background with dark spots/stripes. Hatchlings are about 1 inch (2.5 cm) in straight carapace length and grow up to around 3 to 5 inches (about 8 to 13 cm) by adulthood. Juveniles have three keels on the carapace that usually disappear by adulthood. The loggerhead musk turtle has barbels present on the chin only, not on the throat.

Geographic distribution
S. minor is found in freshwaters of Alabama, Florida, and Georgia.It occurs in the Ogeechee, Altamaha, and Apalachicola river systems.  It shares parts of its range in southeast Alabama, west Florida, and west Georgia with the stripeneck musk turtle (Sternotherus peltifer), and both species can be found in rivers such as the Choctawhatchee and Perdido.

Habitat
S. minor lives in clean freshwater habitats such as springs, streams, runs, wetlands, ponds, and rivers.

Diet 
The diet of the loggerhead musk turtle changes as it grows. Younger turtles have a more varied diet, eating insects, snails, crayfish, and clams while adults eat mostly snails and clams since adults are larger.

The loggerhead musk turtle forages in streams with sandy or vegetated bottoms with varying speeds of currents. It spends most of its time in the water with less time spent basking out in the sun than is observed in other species.

Reproduction
S. minor is oviparous. Between August and June, females can lay up to five clutches with one to four eggs per clutch. Larger females tend to have larger eggs and more eggs per clutch.

Mating Behavior 
In the wild, mating takes place underwater in shaded areas. Males exhibit several different behaviors during the mating process including: cloacal sniffing, bridge sniffing, mounting, following the female, biting, moving the head from one side to the other, and interlocking of tails.

Conservation and Threats 
The IUCN has listed the loggerhead musk turtle as an animal of least concern.

Some common threats to this turtle include habitat loss, negative interactions with humans, such as being killed by cars or boats or dying after biting fish hooks, and indirect threats such as threats to their food sources. While this turtle is vulnerable to habitat loss, many waterways within its range are protected by Florida state law.  Florida list it as a protected species.

References

Further reading
Agassiz L (1857). Contributions to the Natural History of the United States of America. Vol. I. Boston: Little, Brown, and Co. li + 452 pp. (Goniochelys minor, new species, p. 424).
Behler JL, King FW (1979). The Audubon Society Field Guide to North American Reptiles and Amphibians. New York: Alfred A. Knopf. 743 pp. . (Sternotherus minor, p. 444 + Plates 311–312).

McCoy CJ, Bianculli AV, Vogt RC (1978). "Sternotherus minor in the Pascagoula River system, Mississippi". Herpetological Review 9 (3): 109.
Smith HM, Brodie ED Jr (1982). Reptiles of North America: A Guide to Field Identification. New York: Golden Press. 240 pp. . (Sternotherus minor, pp. 28–29).
Smith HM, Glass BP (1947). "A new musk turtle from the southeastern United States". Journal of the Washington Academy of Sciences 37 (1): 22–24. (Sternotherus peltifer, new species).

External links
.
.

Sternotherus
Reptiles described in 1857
Fauna of the Southeastern United States
Reptiles of the United States